Jacques Berthou (born 3 March 1940) was a member of the Senate of France, representing the Ain department as a member of the Socialist Party. He has held other elected posts. In 1995 he was elected as mayor of Miribel, being reelected in 2001 and 2008 and he has also been a member of the general council of Ain, representing the canton of Miribel, where he was elected at the first round of the voting, in 2004.

References
Page on the Senate website

1940 births
Living people
Socialist Party (France) politicians
French Senators of the Fifth Republic
Senators of Ain
Mayors of places in Auvergne-Rhône-Alpes
French people of Breton descent